Grand Guignol refers to the former  of Paris, which specialized in grisly horror shows.

Grand Guignol may also be:
Any gruesome or gory drama or event, such as a Grande Dame Guignol
Grand Guignol (album), album by Naked City
"Le Grand Guignol", song by Soft Cell from the album Cruelty Without Beauty
"Grand Guignol", storyline in the comic book series Starman
"Gesshoku Grand Guignol" (Lunar Eclipse Grand Guignol), song by the Japanese band Ali Project
"Grand Guignol", song by Bajofondo from the album Mar dulce

See also
Guignol, French puppet character